Smartwings Slovakia, formerly Travel Service Slovakia, is a Slovak charter airline based in Bratislava, Slovakia. The company was founded in 2010 and operates from Bratislava Airport. It is a subsidiary of Smartwings (formerly named Travel Service) from the Czech Republic. In December 2018, it adapted its new brand name.

Destinations
Smartwings Slovakia serves the following leisure destinations:

Africa
Cape Verde
Boa Vista - Rabil Airport
Sal - Amílcar Cabral International Airport

Egypt
Hurghada - Hurghada International Airport
Marsa Alam - Marsa Alam International Airport
Sharm el-Sheikh - Sharm el-Sheikh International Airport

Tunisia
Djerba - Zarzis International Airport
Monastir - Monastir – Habib Bourguiba International Airport

Asia
Israel
Tel Aviv - Ben Gurion International Airport

United Arab Emirates
Dubai - Dubai International Airport

Europe
 Albania
Tirana - Tirana Airport

Bulgaria
Burgas - Burgas Airport

Cyprus
Larnaca - Larnaca International Airport
Paphos - Paphos International Airport

Greece
Corfu - Corfu International Airport
Heraklion - Heraklion International Airport 
Kavala-Kavala International Airport
Kalamata - Kalamata International Airport
Kos - Kos Island International Airport
Patras - Araxos Airport
Rhodes - Rhodes International Airport
Thessaloniki - Thessaloniki Airport
Zakynthos - Zakynthos International Airport

Italy
Cagliari - Cagliari-Elmas Airport
Catania - Catania–Fontanarossa Airport
Lamezia Terme - Lamezia Terme Airport
Palermo - Palermo Airport

Slovakia
Bratislava - M. R. Štefánik Airport Base
Košice - Košice International Airport

Spain
Almería - Almería Airport
Fuerteventura - Fuerteventura Airport
Gran Canaria - Las Palmas Airport
Ibiza - Ibiza Airport
Málaga - Málaga-Costa del Sol Airport
Menorca - Menorca Airport
Palma de Mallorca - Palma de Mallorca Airport

Turkey
Antalya - Antalya Airport
Bodrum - Milas–Bodrum Airport
Izmir - Adnan Menderes Airport

Fleet

Current fleet
As of March 2022, Smartwings Slovakia operates the following aircraft:

Former aircraft
 Airbus A320-200

References

External links

Airlines of Slovakia
Airlines established in 2010
Charter airlines
Slovakian companies established in 2010